Raul Renato Herrera Costa (born February 12, 1948), commonly known as Renato Costa or Renato Herrera, is a former Brazilian soccer player who played in the NASL. In 1969, he played in the National Soccer League with Toronto Hellas. In 1977, he was named to the Rochester Lancers Team of the Decade.

Career statistics

Club

Notes

References

Living people
Brazilian footballers
Brazilian expatriate footballers
Association football midfielders
Rochester Lancers (1967–1980) players
Los Angeles Aztecs players
San Antonio Thunder players
North American Soccer League (1968–1984) players
Expatriate soccer players in Canada
Brazilian expatriate sportspeople in Canada
Expatriate soccer players in the United States
Brazilian expatriate sportspeople in the United States
1948 births
Canadian National Soccer League players